Silma López (born 3 July 1991) is a Spanish actress. She is known for her role as Lola in the Netflix series Valeria.

Filmography

Film

Television

References

External links 
 

1991 births
21st-century Spanish actresses
Actresses from Madrid
Living people
Spanish film actresses
Spanish television actresses